Hainford (originally Haynford) is a village and civil parish in the English county of Norfolk.
For the purposes of local government, it falls within the district of Broadland.

The villages name means 'Enclosure ford'.

Location 
Hainford is situated close to the A140. The village is bordered by Hevingham to the north. Buxton to the northeast. Frettenham to the east. Spixworth to the southeast. Newton & Horsham St Faith to the south. Horsford to the west and Stratton Strawless to the northwest.

Transport 
Hainford is located near to the A140 which runs from Ipswich to Cromer via Norwich with its junction with the B1354 which for the second section of its route runs from Hainford to Hoveton (near Wroxham).

Sanders Coaches operate a regular service from Norwich to Reepham via Hainford with other services from Norwich to Sheringham during peak times.

The nearest National Rail station is Hoveton and Wroxham approximately 8 km away.

Services 
The only pub in Hainford is The Chequers which serves food and drink. The pub was the victim of a fire in 1987 in which a fireman lost his life.

There is a local primary school within the Village for children aged 4–11 years old. Children from 11+ attend either Sprowston Community High School or Aylsham High School

Gallery

Notes 

http://kepn.nottingham.ac.uk/map/place/Norfolk/Hainford

External links

Broadland
Villages in Norfolk
Civil parishes in Norfolk